Madonna del Prato (Madonna of the Meadow) is a 1505 painting of the Virgin Mary and the Christ Child by Giovanni Bellini, now in the National Gallery in London. Originally painted as oil and egg tempera on wood, it was transferred to canvas in 1949,  with damage in places.

It presents a medieval iconography of the Virgin of humility seated before a full and shining rural panorama, with both the devotional aspect and the landscape aspect given equal prominence. Full of small details of everyday life, this landscape contributes to the intimate and familiar tone of the two figures. The raven in the tree also possibly symbolises death. The figures' poses invite meditation on Jesus's death and passion, recalling Pietà compositions with the dead adult Jesus in his mother's lap.

References

External links
National Gallery catalogue entry

1505 paintings
Collections of the National Gallery, London
Birds in art
Cattle in art
Prato